Susan Michelsson (born 29 February 1972) is an Australian long-distance runner. In 2001, she competed in the women's marathon at the 2001 World Championships in Athletics held in Edmonton, Alberta, Canada. She finished in 40th place.

References

External links 
 

Living people
1972 births
Place of birth missing (living people)
Australian female long-distance runners
Australian female marathon runners
World Athletics Championships athletes for Australia
20th-century Australian women
21st-century Australian women